The 2019–20 Primeira Liga (also known as Liga NOS for sponsorship reasons) was the 86th season of the Primeira Liga, the top professional league for Portuguese association football clubs. The season started on 9 August 2019 and was finished on 26 July 2020. 

Benfica were the defending champions, after winning their 37th league title in the previous season. Paços de Ferreira and Famalicão were promoted from the second-tier 2018–19 LigaPro, while Gil Vicente were promoted directly from the third-tier 2018–19 Campeonato de Portugal by court decision. They replaced Chaves, Nacional and Feirense, who were relegated to the 2019–20 LigaPro.

On 12 March 2020, the Liga Portuguesa de Futebol Profissional (LPFP) suspended the Primeira Liga due to the COVID-19 pandemic in Portugal. Following the government's approval, the league resumed play on 3 June, with matches of the remaining ten matchdays taking place behind closed doors.

On 15 July 2020, Porto secured their 29th league title with two matches remaining after defeating Sporting CP 2–0 at home.

After the end of the season, on 26 July, Desportivo das Aves and Portimonense were relegated to the 2020–21 LigaPro. However, two days later, Desportivo das Aves and Vitória de Setubal were relegated to the 2020–21 Campeonato de Portugal by decision of the Liga Portuguesa de Futebol Profissional ("LPFP") after both clubs failed to meet the necessary requirements to obtain a licence for registration to participate in professional domestic competitions.

Effects of the COVID-19 pandemic
Due to the COVID-19 pandemic in Portugal, on 10 March 2020, the LPFP announced that all fixtures on matchday 24 (6–8 March) would be played behind closed doors following the Portuguese government to suspend events in open spaces with more than 5,000 people, as well as events behind closed doors with more than 1,000 participants, until 3 April. Two days later, the LPFP suspended the Primeira Liga and LigaPro until further notice because of effects of the coronavirus pandemic in Portugal. The decision was taken following the Portuguese Football Federation ("FPF")'s announcement of suspending their own non-professional football and futsal competitions and also due to an emergency meeting between the Sindicato dos Jogadores Profissionais de Futebol ("SJPF"), the LPFP and the FPF to monitor the situation, in view of the proposal to suspend all sports competitions, which the SJPF added that in case of infection, there would be an aggravated loss. Shortly after, LPFP president Pedro Proença met with several presidents of Primeira Liga's clubs to assess the impact of the stoppage of professional championships due to the COVID-19 pandemic. He revealed a COVID-19 economic support plan to support the treasury of various clubs in the Primeira Liga and LigaPro. Afterwards, the LPFP announced the creation of an Economic Impact Monitoring Group that would be responsible for presenting measures to support the clubs that competed in the Primeira Liga and LigaPro. The FPF also opened a credit line to support the finances of non-professional football and futsal clubs in the amount of one million euros to minimize the effects of the pandemic on their finances.

On 28 April, Prime Minister of Portugal António Costa reunited with the presidents of the "Big Three" clubs in Portugal (S.L. Benfica, Sporting CP and FC Porto), the president of the FPF and the president of the LPFP to discuss the conditions of the return of football in Portugal. The reunion caused some controversy for some Primeira Liga clubs such as Braga and Vitória de Guimarães, who were not satisfied that only the "Big Three" clubs were the only ones invited to the discussion, and instead believed all Primeira Liga clubs should have been invited. Two days later, António Costa approved the return of the league, with all matches being resumed behind closed doors following the consent of the Portuguese Ministry of Health.

On 11 May, it was announced that several teams in the Primeira Liga had players tested positive for COVID-19, with Benfica having a player from its reserve team to be infected, followed by three players from Famalicão, Moreirense and Vitória de Guimarães that were sent home and were isolated from the rest of their respective teams. On 20 May, LPFP president Pedro Proença president proposed that following the restart of the league, the matches played should be shown on the free-to-air television station RTP in Portugal instead of the pay TV subscriptions, with the backing of the Portuguese government. However, this proposal caused some controversy with the league's main sponsor, NOS, and several other sponsors, as well as various other clubs in the league, most notably Benfica and Porto. This prompted rumours that Proença could be forced to end his term prematurely, rumours Proença later dismissed. Later that month, Benfica left the board of LPFP due to the controversy.

On 14 May, after a meeting of all clubs, five substitutions will be permitted, which was temporarily allowed by IFAB following a proposal by FIFA to lessen the impact of fixture congestion. On 22 May, the LPFP announced that the league would be resumed on 3 June. On 27 May, it was announced that one of the assistant referees for a league match between Benfica and Marítimo had tested positive for COVID-19, leading him to be replaced by another referee for the scheduled league match.

On 30 May, the LPFP approved a plan to resume the league, but during the reunion between all clubs of the league, Marítimo refused to accept the five substitutions rules, leading the rule to be accepted on 8 June by the LPFP despite Marítimo's refusal.

Teams
Eighteen teams competed in the league – the top fifteen teams from the previous season, the two teams promoted from the LigaPro (Paços de Ferreira and Famalicão) and one team promoted directly from the third-tier Campeonato de Portugal (Gil Vicente).
Paços de Ferreira came back to the top division one season after being relegated, while Famalicão secured their return after a 25-year absence. Gil Vicente, having been relegated to the third-level of Portuguese football in the 2018–19 season, were reinstated in the Primeira Liga by court decision, five years after their last participation.
These three teams replaced Chaves, Feirense (both relegated after three years in the top flight), and Nacional (relegated one season after their promotion).

Stadia and locations

Personnel and sponsors

Managerial changes

League table

Positions by round

The table lists the positions of teams after each week of matches. In order to preserve chronological evolvements, any postponed matches are not included to the round at which they were originally scheduled, but added to the full round they were played immediately afterwards.

Results

Statistics

Top goalscorers

Hat-tricks

Notes
(H) – Home team(A) – Away team

Top assists

Clean sheets

Discipline

Player 
 Most yellow cards: 14
 José Semedo (Vitória de Setúbal)

 Most red cards: 2
 João Afonso (Gil Vicente)
 Sebastián Coates (Sporting CP)
 José Semedo (Vitória de Setúbal)
 Raul Silva (Braga)
 Alex Telles (Porto)
 Rafik Halliche (Moreirense)

Club 
 Most yellow cards: 102
Paços de Ferreira

 Most red cards: 6
Famalicão

Awards

Monthly awards

Annual awards
Annual awards were announced on 29 August 2020.

Number of teams by district

Notes

References

Primeira Liga seasons
Portugal
1
Primeira Liga